Harrisinopsis is a genus of moths belonging to the family Zygaenidae.

Species
Species:
 Harrisinopsis robusta Jordan, 1913

References

Zygaenidae
Zygaenidae genera